Clement Fisher may refer to:

Clement Fisher (16th century MP) for Tamworth
Sir Clement Fisher, 2nd Baronet (1613–1683), MP for Coventry
Sir Clement Fisher, 3rd Baronet (c. 1675–1729), of the Fisher baronets

See also
Fisher (surname)